The 1987 Kentucky gubernatorial election was held on November 3, 1987. Democratic nominee Wallace Wilkinson defeated Republican nominee John Harper with 64.50% of the vote.

Primary elections
Primary elections were held on May 26, 1987.

Democratic primary

Candidates
Wallace Wilkinson, businessman
John Y. Brown Jr., former Governor
Steve Beshear, incumbent Lieutenant Governor
W. Grady Stumbo, former Secretary of the Kentucky Cabinet for Human Resources
Julian Carroll, former Governor
Stanley Luttrell
Dinwiddle Lampton Jr.

Results

Republican primary

Candidates
John Harper, State Representative
Joseph E. Johnson III
Leonard "Buck" Beasley
Thurman Jerome Hamlin

Results

General election

Candidates
Wallace Wilkinson, Democratic
John Harper, Republican

Results

References

1987
Kentucky
Governor